Nanitic is a Canadian short drama film, directed by Carol Nguyen and released in 2022. The film centres on a young Vietnamese-Canadian girl who observes as her aunt takes care of her terminally ill grandmother.

The film's cast includes Kylie Le, Ly Pham, Van Pham, Dam Nguyen, Eve Sevigny, Fred Nguyen and An Nguyen.

The film premiered at the 2022 Toronto International Film Festival, where it was named the winner of the Share Her Journey award. The film was named to TIFF's annual year-end Canada's Top Ten list for 2022.

References

External links

2022 films
2022 short films
Canadian drama short films
2020s Canadian films
Films about Vietnamese Canadians